The Telfair Academy  is a historic mansion at 121 Barnard Street in Savannah, Georgia.  It was designed by William Jay and built in 1818, and is one of a small number of Jay's surviving works. It is one of three sites owned by Telfair Museums. Originally a family townhouse belonging to the Telfair family, it became a free art museum in 1886, and thus one of the first 10 art museums in America, and the oldest public art museum in the South.  Its first director, elected in 1883, was artist Carl Ludwig Brandt, who spent winters in Savannah.   It was declared a National Historic Landmark in 1976.

Architecture and history
Telfair Academy is located in historic central Savannah, on the west side of Telfair Square.  It occupies an entire block, bounded by Barnard, West President, North Jefferson, and West State Streets.  It is a two-story masonry structure, built out of brick finished in stucco. Its entrance is a form typical of architect William Jay, with a projecting four-column portico that is accessed via side-facing stairs.  The columns are of a composite order, and the portico's entablature is continued around the building as a stringcourse.  Unlike the symmetrical exterior, the interior of the house is asymmetrical, its unusually shaped rooms including an octagonal drawing room, round-ended dining room, and long drawing room with rounded ends.  The building's west wing is its former carriage house, which was adapted in the 1880s as part of the building's conversion to a museum, and has fine Adam style woodwork.

The house was designed by William Jay and built in 1818 for Alexander Telfair, son of Edward Telfair, one of Georgia's early post-independence governors.  The site on which it was built previously housed the official residence of Georgia's colonial royal governors.  In 1875 Alexander's sister, Mary, bequeathed the house, including its furnishings and family collections, to the Georgia Historical Society, which opened the first art museum in the southeastern United States here in 1886.  The house was remodeled and expanded to be a museum by architect Detlef Lienau.

Collection
Telfair Academy features furnished period rooms that highlight the museum's collection of decorative arts and many family furnishings including beautiful 19th and 20th century American and European paintings and sculptures. In front of the building are statues of Rembrandt, Rubens, Phidias, Raphael, and Michelangelo (see the link to Commons below).

Savannah artists 
In addition to these works from notable European and American artists, Telfair Academy houses fine and decorative artworks representing Savannah's history and from native Savannah artists.
 Myrtle Jones - self-taught streetscape and portrait painter; studied briefly at the Telfair Academy of Arts and Sciences under Emil Holzhauer and others.

See also 
List of National Historic Landmarks in Georgia (U.S. state)
National Register of Historic Places listings in Chatham County, Georgia

Photos

References

External links
 
www.telfair.org Official web site

Telfair Academy historical marker

National Historic Landmarks in Savannah, Georgia
Historic American Buildings Survey in Georgia (U.S. state)
Museums in Savannah, Georgia
Houses completed in 1818
Historic house museums in Georgia (U.S. state)
Houses in Savannah, Georgia
National Register of Historic Places in Savannah, Georgia
Telfair Square buildings
Savannah Historic District